The 2019 Latrobe City Traralgon ATP Challenger was a professional tennis tournament played on outdoor hard court. It was the eighth edition of the tournament which was part of the 2019 ATP Challenger Tour. It took place in Traralgon, Australia between 21–27 October 2019.

Singles main draw entrants

Seeds

 Rankings are as of 14 October 2019.

Other entrants
The following players received wildcards into the singles main draw:
  Jai Corbett
  Cameron Green
  William Ma
  Tristan Schoolkate
  Dane Sweeny

The following player received entry into the singles main draw using a protected ranking:
  Bradley Mousley

The following player received entry into the singles main draw as an alternate:
  Aaron Addison

The following players received entry from the qualifying draw:
  James Ibrahim
  Brandon Walkin

Champions

Singles

  Marc Polmans def.  Andrew Harris 7–5, 6–3.

Doubles

  Max Purcell /  Luke Saville def.  Brydan Klein /  Scott Puodziunas 6–7(2–7), 6–3, [10–4].

References

External links
 Official website 

Latrobe City Traralgon ATP Challenger
2019 in Australian tennis
2019
October 2019 sports events in Australia